In molecular biology, the NADH dehydrogenase (ubiquinone) 1 alpha subcomplex subunit 7 family of proteins (also known as NADH-ubiquinone oxidoreductase subunit B14.5a or Complex I-B14.5a) form a part of NADH dehydrogenase (complex I). In mammals, it is encoded by the NDUFA7 gene.

References

Protein families